Sunyani West is one of the constituencies represented in the Parliament of Ghana. It elects one Member of Parliament (MP) by the first past the post system of election.

Ignatius Baffour Awuah is the member of parliament for the constituency. He was elected on the ticket of the New Patriotic Party (NPP) won a majority of 9,815 votes to become the MP. He succeeded Kwadwo Adjei Darko who had also represented the constituency in the 4th Republic parliament.

See also
List of Ghana Parliament constituencies

References 

Parliamentary constituencies in the Bono Region